Stephen Patrick Hunt (born 1 August 1981) is an Irish former professional footballer who played as a winger for played for Crystal Palace, Brentford, Reading, Hull City, Wolverhampton Wanderers, Ipswich Town and Coventry City. At international level, he made 39 appearances scoring once for the Republic of Ireland national team. His younger brother, Noel, is also a footballer.

Club career

Early years
Hunt became known for his creative and skilful play as well as his work rate as a winger. Although born in Laois, Hunt grew up in Clonea-Power, Waterford. He was a talented under-age hurler and soccer player. He played for Waterford hurlers at under-15 and under-16 levels. Hurling was his first love.

Hunt's first introduction to organised football was when he moved to the Christian Brothers' Secondary School in Carrick-on-Suir, Co. Tipperary at the age of 11. During his time at secondary school he also began playing for Waterford soccer side Johnville F.C. and won a Munster Schools Junior Cup with Carrick CBS. This gained Hunt a degree of recognition and he played in the Kennedy Cup with Waterford County. He later excelled for Carrick United at various age levels, before going to England starting his career as a trainee with Crystal Palace. Failing to make an impact on the first team, Hunt had trials with clubs including Dundee United before leaving to join Brentford. In his four years at the West London club, he became an integral part of the team and stood in as captain for Michael Dobson for a run of matches during the 2003–04 season.

In 2005 Hunt rejected a new contract and decided to leave Brentford. After agreeing to join Bradford City, late interest from Reading, then in the Football League Championship, made him change his mind.

Reading
Hunt was denied more starting appearances in his first Reading season by the form of Bobby Convey. He still made a good contribution, appearing from the bench, as Reading won the Championship title and promotion to the Premiership during the 2005–06 season.

On 14 October 2006, Hunt's knee collided with Chelsea's goalkeeper Petr Čech when the Reading player was lunging at the ball, resulting in Čech undergoing surgery for a depressed fracture of the skull. After the injury, Petr Čech had to wear head protection during every game. Following the incident, Premier League officials, players, pundits, player's representatives and even MPs expressed views either condemning or supporting Hunt and the others involved in the aftermath of the incident. The FA eventually confirmed that no action would be taken against Hunt but, in the meantime, both Hunt and teammate Ibrahima Sonko, involved in a collision in the same match with Čech's replacement Carlo Cudicini, had allegedly received death threats from Chelsea fans. Cech revealed that while Hunt had been speaking about the incident in the press for months, he hadn't personally contacted or apologized to him. Hunt scored his first Premier League goal in the 6–0 home win over West Ham.

During the January 2008 transfer window, Reading rejected a series of bids (peaking at £5.5 million) from Sunderland for Hunt, but Reading confirmed that they had no intention of selling players at that time.  On 1 February 2008, Hunt signed a new deal with Reading keeping him at the club until the summer of 2011. In 2007–08, Hunt scored 6 goals in 39 appearances for Reading's first team but could not prevent the club being relegated on goal difference.

On 4 February 2009, Reading confirmed that Hunt had signed a new three-and-a-half year contract, that would keep him at the club until the summer of 2012. However, after the club failed in their attempt to win an instant return to the Premier League, losing in the playoff semi finals to Burnley, Hunt announced his intention to leave Reading in the hope securing a move back to the Premier League.

Hull City
On 13 August 2009 it was confirmed that Hunt had signed for Hull City for an undisclosed fee, believed to be around the region of £3.5 million. He scored his first goal for the club 28 minutes into his debut against Chelsea on 15 August 2009. This was also the first goal of the 2009–10 Premier League season. However, he was taunted by Chelsea fans throughout the game, due to the incident with Cech. Hunt also scored in his next match, his home debut for Hull City, but they were beaten 5–1 by Tottenham.

In the January transfer window, Hunt was the subject of a £5 million bid from Wolverhampton Wanderers, but the Tigers rejected it. Shortly after, Hunt suffered a foot injury that ruled him out of the run-in. In his absence, the club were relegated amid growing financial worries.

Wolverhampton Wanderers
On 21 June 2010 Wolverhampton Wanderers signed Hunt on a three-year deal for an undisclosed fee, reported to be £3 million. Hunt, still recovering from his foot injury from his time with Hull, did not return to action until several months into the season, making his Wolves debut as a substitute against Chelsea on 23 October 2010. He scored his first goal for the club on 27 November, a 3–2 win against Sunderland.

In the early part of 2011, Hunt suffered calf and hernia injuries which kept him out of action for up to three months. He returned from injury for the final five fixtures of the season and scored three minutes from time on the final day of the season against Blackburn Rovers to guarantee Wolves their Premier League safety.

Although undergoing a groin operation, Hunt was largely a regular player for Wolves throughout the 2011–12 season as the club suffered relegation. His campaign back in the Championship was hampered by a persistent hip injury but he played regularly throughout the final months as the team was once again relegated. At the conclusion of the season it was announced that Hunt would be free to leave as his contract had expired. In total he made 66 appearances for the club, scoring eight times.

Ipswich Town
On 8 November 2013, Hunt signed a short-term deal with Ipswich Town. He made his debut for Ipswich the following day on 9 November, in a 2–3 away win over Blackpool at Bloomfield Road. He made 24 appearances during his first season at the club without scoring.

On 30 June 2014, Hunt signed a further one-year deal with Ipswich. He made his first appearance of the 2014–15 season on 18 October, starting in a 1–1 draw with Blackburn Rovers. He featured less regularly over the course of the season due to the form of wingers Paul Anderson and Jay Tabb. He made 19 appearances during the season, helping Ipswich reach the Championship play-offs. He left Ipswich following the end of the season after the club did not offer him a new deal.

Coventry City
On 8 January 2016, Hunt signed a short-term deal with League 1 promotion chasing side Coventry City after a short spell as a free agent. He made 5 appearances for the club during the remainder of the season.

He retired from playing football at the end of the 2015–16 season.

He has since founded his own football agency, and looks after the needs of a whole host of players across the UK and Europe.

International career

Hunt earned his first cap for the Republic of Ireland in their 2–1 win away to San Marino on 7 February 2007, coming on as a substitute. Later that year he was sent off following a challenge on Jan Polák in a match against the Czech Republic on 12 September 2007.

The midfielder became a regular member of Giovanni Trapattoni's team that narrowly failed to qualify for the 2010 World Cup. Hunt scored his first, and only international goal through a late penalty in a 2–3 friendly defeat to Poland at Croke Park on 19 November 2008. He was subsequently selected as part of Ireland's squad for the Euro 2012 tournament but did not play in any of their games.

Personal life
Hunt has a sister and three brothers, Noel,  James and Anthony and is married to Kevin Doyle's cousin, Joanne. He attended CBS Carrick-on-Suir in County Tipperary.

Career statistics

Club

International

Scores and results list Republic of Ireland's goal tally first, score column indicates score after each Hunt goal.

Honours
Reading
Football League Championship: 2005–06

Republic of Ireland
 Nations Cup: 2011

Individual
Football League Championship Player of the Month: December 2008
Reading Player of the Year: 2007–08
PFA Team of the Year: 2008–09 Championship
Hull City Player of the Year: 2009–10

References

External links

1981 births
Living people
People from Portlaoise
Waterford inter-county hurlers
Association footballers from County Laois
Association footballers from County Waterford
Republic of Ireland association footballers
Association football wingers
Crystal Palace F.C. players
Brentford F.C. players
Reading F.C. players
Hull City A.F.C. players
Wolverhampton Wanderers F.C. players
Ipswich Town F.C. players
Coventry City F.C. players
English Football League players
Premier League players
Republic of Ireland under-21 international footballers
Republic of Ireland B international footballers
Republic of Ireland international footballers
UEFA Euro 2012 players
Republic of Ireland expatriate association footballers
Irish expatriate sportspeople in England
Expatriate footballers in England